Qi Qi (born September 28, 2003) is a Chinese artistic gymnast. Best known as a vault and floor specialist, she is a two-time Chinese national vault champion (2018, 2020), the 2020 Chinese national floor champion, and a ten-time medalist at the Chinese Artistic Gymnastics Championships. On the junior level, she is the 2018 Asian all-around, vault, and floor exercise champion.

Career

Junior

2017 
Qi competed at the senior-level 2017 Chinese National Championships, where she qualified in 16th place to the all-around final with the top vault score in the qualification round. She placed second in the team final representing the Beijing provincial team and also placed second in the vault final behind Liu Jinru. Qi was the only gymnast in the final to earn an execution score above 9.000 on either vault, which she achieved on her double-twisting Yurchenko (DTY).

2018 
Qi won the gold medal as part of the Chinese team with He Licheng, Tang Xijing, Yin Sisi, and Zhao Shiting at the 2018 Junior Asian Championships in Jakarta, Indonesia. Individually, she won the all-around ahead of Zhao and Lee Yun-seo of South Korea, as well as both vault and floor. At the 2018 Chinese National Championships, Qi tied with Liu Jinru for the title on vault. She also won a second consecutive silver with the Beijing team and placed fourth in the floor final behind Liu, Yin Sisi, and Zhao Shiting.

Senior

2019 
Qi made her senior international debut as a member of the Chinese team at the 2019 City of Jesolo Trophy with Liu Tingting, Tang Xijing, and Zhang Jin, where they won the silver medal behind the United States. She individually placed twelfth in the all-around and won bronze on floor behind Americans Sunisa Lee and Emma Malabuyo.

At the 2019 Chinese National Championships, Qi qualified in seventh place to the all-around final, third place to the vault final, and fifth place to the beam final. During the team final, which also served as the all-around final, Qi and Tang Xijing led the Beijing provincial team to a third consecutive silver medal. Qi recorded the top vault and floor scores of the day and landed the Silivas (double-twisting double tuck) skill on floor exercise for the first time in competition. Individually, Qi improved her ranking from qualifications to finish sixth all-around. In event finals, Qi upgraded her second vault to a Chusovitina to win the silver medal behind Liu Jinru and won bronze on beam behind junior Ou Yushan and Tang.

In September, after recording the top floor score at the final internal test, Qi was named to the Chinese team for the 2019 World Championships in Stuttgart, Germany alongside Chen Yile, Li Shijia, Liu Tingting, Tang Xijing, and alternate Zhang Jin. In the qualification round, Qi competed on vault and floor to help the team qualify in second behind the United States. Qi was the last qualifier for the vault final, but did not make the floor final after electing not to compete the Silivas. In the team final, she hit both of her routines, but China finished in fourth behind the United States, Russia, and Italy after the team counted three falls. Qi finished fifth in the vault final.

2020 
Qi competed at the 2020 Chinese National Championships in September. In the qualification round, which also served as the team final, she qualified in 5th place to the all-around final and in first place to both the vault and floor exercise finals. Qi and Tang Xijing led the Beijing provincial team to a fourth consecutive team silver medal. In the all-around final, Qi hit four routines cleanly to move up the rankings and win the bronze medal behind Liu Tingting and Wei Xiaoyuan. She recorded the highest score of the night on floor exercise by a wide margin after sticking her opening Silivas and introducing a one-and-a-half twist through to triple twist second tumbling pass, and recorded the second-highest vault score behind Zhang Jin.

In event finals, Qi won gold on vault ahead reigning Asian champion Yu Linmin and three-time and reigning national vault champion Liu Jinru. Qi recorded the highest difficulty score (5.8 for her Chusovitina) and the highest execution score (9.000 for her DTY) among all competitors. On the last day of competition, which coincided with her 17th birthday, Qi won her first national floor exercise title ahead of Wu Ran and Lu Yufei. Qi was the most decorated gymnast of the competition with two gold medals, a silver, and a bronze.

Selected competitive skills

Competitive history

References

2003 births
Living people
Chinese female artistic gymnasts